The first election to the Powys County Council following  local government reorganisation was held in May 1995. It was followed by the 1999 election.

Results Overview 
No Overall Control 
 

|}

Ward Results (Brecknockshire)

Aber-craf (one seat)

Builth (one seat)

Bwlch (one seat)

Crickhowell (two seats)

Cwmtwrch (one seat)

Felin-fach (one seat)

Gwernyfed (one seat)

Hay (one seat)

Llanafanfawr, Erwood (one seat)

Llanfyrnach, Talybont-on-Usk (one seat)

Llangammarch, Llanwrtyd Wells (one seat)

Llangattock (one seat)

Llangors (one seat)

Llangynidr (one seat)

Maescar / Llywel (one seat)

St Davids Within (one seat)

St John (two seats)

St Mary (two seats)

Talgarth (two seats)

Tawe Uchaf (one seat)

Ynyscedwyn (one seat)

Yscir (one seat)

Ystradgynlais (two seats)

Ward Results (Montgomeryshire)

Banwy (one seat)

Berriew (one seat)

Caaersws, Carno (one seat)

Churchstoke (one seat)

Dolforwyn (one seat)

Forden (one seat)

Glantwymyn, Cadfarch (one seat)

Guilsfield Within (one seat)

Guilsfield Without (one seat)

Kerry (one seat)

Llanbrynmair (one seat)

Llandinam (one seat)

Llandrinio (one seat)

Llandysilio (one seat)

Llanfair Caereinion (one seat)

Llanfihangel (one seat)

Llanfyllin (one seat)

Llanidloes (two seats)

Llanrhaeadr-ym-Mochnant (one seat)

Llansantffraid (one seat)

Llanwddyn (one seat)

Machynlleth (one seat)

Meifod (one seat)

Mochdre (one seat)

Montgomery (one seat)

Newtown Central(two seats)

Newtown East (one seat)

Newtown Llanllwchaiaran North (one seat)

Newtown Llanllwchaiaran West

Newtown South (one seat)

Rhiwcynon (one seat)

Trefeglwys, Llangurig (one seat)

Trewern (one seat)

Welshpool Castle (one seat)

Welshpool Gungrog (one seat)

Welshpool Llanerchyddol (one seat)

Ward Results (Radnorshire)

Clyro, Painscastle (one seat)

Disserth and Trecoed (one seat)

Glasbury (one seat)

Glascwm, Llanelwedd (one seat)

Knighton (two seats)

Llanbadarn Fawr (one seat)

Llanbister, Beguildy (one seat)

Llandrindod East/West (one seat)

Llandrindod North (one seat)

Llandrindod South (one seat)

Llanfihangel Rhuditon, Llangunllo (one seat)

Llanyre (one seat)

Old Radnor, New Radnor, Gladestry (one seat)

Presteigne (one seat)

Rhayader (one seat)

St Harmon, Nantmel (one seat)

By-Elections 1995-1999

References

1995
1995 Welsh local elections